Charles H. Helm House, also known as the John and Wilhelmina Helm House, is a historic home located at Washington, Franklin County, Missouri. It was built about 1873, and is a small -story, two bay brick dwelling.  It has a side gable roof and tall jack arch door and window openings.  Also on the property is the contributing one room frame kitchen building (c. 1900)

It was listed on the National Register of Historic Places in 2000.

References

Houses on the National Register of Historic Places in Missouri
Houses completed in 1873
Buildings and structures in Franklin County, Missouri
National Register of Historic Places in Franklin County, Missouri